Canton Lake is a freshwater reservoir located in Fulton County, Illinois. Known for its trophy sized largemouth bass and its abundant channel catfish. The lake's major fish species are Largemouth Bass, Crappie, Bluegill, Yellow bass, Channel catfish, Carp, and Gizzard Shad. The City of Canton, Illinois has various user fees for boat use and an 85 horse power motor limit. The lake had a large number of channel catfish, largemouth bass, and tiger muskie stocked over the last decade.

References

Reservoirs in Illinois
Protected areas of Fulton County, Illinois
Bodies of water of Fulton County, Illinois